The Path of the Mani is an ancient high-road from Kathmandu, Nepal, to the mountain pass of Langtang between the valleys of Nepal and the dry highlands of the Tibetan plateau.

References

Geography of Nepal
Roads in Nepal
Himalayas